The 2014–15 Miami RedHawks men's basketball team represented Miami University during the 2014–15 NCAA Division I men's basketball season. The RedHawks, led by third year head coach John Cooper, played their home games at Millett Hall, as members of the East Division of the Mid-American Conference. They finished the season 13–19, 8–10 in MAC play to finish in fifth place in the East Division. They lost in the first round of the MAC tournament to Eastern Michigan.

Roster

Schedule

|-
!colspan=9 style="background:#CE1126; color:white;"|  Exhibition

|-
!colspan=9 style="background:#CE1126; color:white;"| Regular season

|-
!colspan=9 style="background:#CE1126; color:white;"| MAC tournament

References

Miami
Miami RedHawks men's basketball seasons